Paul Matteoli (7 November 1929 – 12 December 1988) was a French cyclist who was active on the road and track between 1949 and 1956. On track, he won a bronze medal in the individual pursuit at the 1950 World Championships, as well as two national titles in 1950 and 1951. On the road, he won the Marseille-Toulon-Marseille race in 1949 and Tour de l'Ain in 1953.

References

1929 births
1988 deaths
French male cyclists
Sportspeople from Var (department)
People from Ollioules
Cyclists from Provence-Alpes-Côte d'Azur